This article is a list of prominent people of Chinese ancestry who were born in or have settled in the United Kingdom.

To be included in this list, the person must have a Wikipedia article showing they are British Chinese or must have references showing they are British Chinese and are notable.

Academia
 Kevin Fong, professor of medicine, UCL academic.
 Charles K. Kao, KBE, Nobel Prize in Physics, pioneer in the development and use of fibre-optics in telecommunications

Acting

 Leah Bracknell, actress and yoga teacher, Eurasian, English father and Chinese-Malaysian mother
 Gemma Chan, actress
 Julia Chan, actress
 Lobo Chan, actor
 Maggie Cheung, actress
 Tsai Chin, actress and singer, first Chinese Bond girl
 Vera Chok, actress
 Christina Chong, actress
 China Chow, actress and model
 Paul Courtenay Hyu, actor, writer and Elvis impersonator, Eurasian
 Linda Louise Duan, actress
 Jon Foo, actor and wushu martial artist
 Mona Hammond, actress
 Jessica Henwick, actress, Eurasian
 Sandrine Holt, Canadian actress 
 Burt Kwouk, actor
 Pui Fan Lee, actress and television presenter
 Katie Leung, actress
 Jessie Mei Li, actress
 Jennifer Lim, actress
 Pik-Sen Lim, actress
 Jing Lusi, actress
 Jane March, actress, Eurasian
 Max Minghella, actor, Eurasian
 Carl Ng, actor, Eurasian
 Suan-Li Ong actress-model
 Colin Ryan, actor, Eurasian
 Marli Siu, actress, Eurasian
 Jessica Sula, actress
 Elaine Tan, actress
 Elizabeth Tan, actress
 Lewis Tan, actor and martial artist
 Jason Tobin, actor
 Rhydian Vaughan, actor, Eurasian
 Benedict Wong, actor
 Jason Wong, actor
 Sophie Wu, actress, Eurasian
 Tom Wu, actor
 David Yip, actor, Eurasian
 George Young, actor and writer, Eurasian
 Ric Young, actor
 Crystal Yu, actress
 Ozzie Yue, actor and singer
 Lucy Sheen, actor

Art and design

 Suki Chan, British Chinese artist
Stanley Chow, artist and illustrator 
 Aowen Jin, British Chinese artist and social commentator
 Qu Lei Lei, artist and calligrapher
 Cary Kwok, artist
 Chris Liu, fashion designer
 Beatrix Ong, luxury fashion accessory and shoe designer
 Gok Wan, fashion consultant and television presenter

Business
 Andrew Ng, co-founder of education technology company Coursera, director of Stanford University's Artificial Intelligence Lab
 Sir David Tang, founder of fashion chain Shanghai Tang, socialite and writer
 Woon Wing Yip, founder of the British Chinese supermarket chain Wing Yip

Food

 Mi Gao Huang Chen, takeaway owner who was murdered in 2005
 Ching-He Huang, food broadcaster and food writer
 Nancy Lam, chef
 Willian "Bill" Poon, chef and restaurateur
 Alan Yau, restaurateur, founder of Wagamama, Hakkasan and Yauatcha
 Michael Chow, British-American restaurateur
 Kim-Joy Hewlett, baker, cookbook author, and finalist in the ninth series of The Great British Bake Off of Chinese Malaysian descent
 Kenneth Lo, writer of more than 30 Chinese cookbooks

Music

 Ayi Jihu, singer
 Zilan Liao, guzheng, concert harp and director of Pagoda arts
 Jason Lai, orchestral conductor
 Herman Li, of the power metal band DragonForce
 Melvyn Tan, classical pianist
 Jasmine Thompson, singer
 Matt Tong, drummer of indie rock bands Bloc Party and Algiers
 Fou Ts'ong, pianist
 KT Tunstall, musician
 Vanessa-Mae, violinist
 Jamie Woon, dubstep artist
 Raymond Yiu, composer
 Cheng Yu, pipa and guqin musician
 Guo Yue, dizi and bawu musician

Politics
 Michael Chan, Baron Chan, politician, life peer in the House of Lords
 Steven Dominique Cheung, Diana Award winner, youngest candidate for the European Election in 2009, DJ of Spectrum Radio and SW1 Radio
 Johnny Luk, Parliamentary Candidate and Conservative Party activist
 Alan Mak, Member of Parliament for Havant since 2015, first British Chinese member of the House of Commons
 Sarah Owen, Member of Parliament for Luton North
 Nat Wei, Baron Wei, social entrepreneur, former government advisor and member of the House of Lords

Sport
 Eden Cheng, British diver
 Joe Choong, British Olympic gold-medal winning pentathlete
 Sammy Chung, second person of Chinese descent to manage an English football league club
 Brian Moore, former English rugby union rugby player. 
 Emma Raducanu, British tennis player
 Frank Soo, first player of Chinese descent to play in the Football League, and the first non-white player to represent England
 Alex Hua Tian, Olympic event rider, gave up his British Citizenship in order to compete in the 2008 Beijing Olympics as part of the Chinese team
 Rory Underwood, former English rugby union rugby player; Eurasian
 Tony Underwood, former rugby union player, brother of Rory Underwood
 Alex Yee, Olympic gold medallist in triathlon.
 Li Ke (born Nico Yennaris), footballer, gave up his British citizenship to play for the Chinese national team; Eurasian
 Tyias Browning, footballer, (also known as Jiang Guangtai) gave up his British citizenship to play for the Chinese national team; Chinese from his maternal grandfather.

Television

 Alexa Chung, TV presenter, fashion model, contributing editor at British Vogue; Eurasian

Writers

 Jung Chang, writer, co-author of the biography Mao: The Unknown Story
 Leslie Charteris, writer and creator of antihero Simon Templar, alias The Saint
Sue Cheung, novelist and illustrator of children’s book
 Anhua Gao, writer
 Jo Ho, screenwriter, director, and first Chinese person in the UK to create a television drama series, the 2010 BBC fantasy Spirit Warriors
 Hsiung Shih-I, writer who became the first Chinese person to write and direct a West End play in 1935
 Timothy Mo, British novelist
 Chee Soo, author and teacher on Taoism, traditional Chinese medicine and martial arts
 Xue Xinran, broadcaster, author and founder of the charity Mother's Bridge of Love
 Benjamin Yeoh, playwright

See also
 Chinese clan
 Overseas Chinese
 List of overseas Chinese
 List of Chinese Americans
 List of Chinese Australians
 List of Chinese Canadians
 List of Chinese Filipinos
 List of Malaysian Chinese
 List of Chinese New Zealanders

References

Chinese
Chinese diaspora
 
Chinese
Chinese community in the United Kingdom